The Ariake-class destroyer is a class of destroyers of the Japan Maritime Self-Defense Force.

Development 

After World War II, they were in a mothball state, but on 10 March 1959, they were handed over to Japan at Long Beach in the United States based on the Japan-US Ship Loan Agreement, towed as it was, and moved to Yokosuka Port on 16 April. Both ships held a self-defense ship flag award ceremony on 20 April, and officially became self-defense ships. The mothball dismantling work was carried out at Uraga Dock for Ariake and at Ishikawajima Heavy Industries Tokyo No. 2 Factory for Yūgure. All the launch tubes were removed, a trainee auditorium with a capacity of 40 people was newly established, and a part of the fuel tank was converted into a fresh water tank. This is because this model has the main task of training, and later Ariake participated in the practicing voyage three times and Yūgure four times. At this time, Ariake replaced her sonar with QJA.

After the construction was completed, Yūgure was recommissioned on 17 December 1959. Ariake suffered a breakage accident of the main turbine blade during sea trials, and it was necessary to order parts from the United States, so the recommission was delayed to 21 April 1960.

On 2 March 1970, the 2nd Training Corps was abolished, and Ariake was incorporated into the Practical Experiment Corps (predecessor of the Development Corps). In March of the same year, Ishikawajima Harima Heavy Industries began bow extension work to replace the conventional bow in order to convert it to a low-frequency long-range prototype bow sonar T-101 experimental ship under development at the Technical Research and Development Institute of the Defense Agency. It was cut and replaced with a newly built bow sonar bow, which was  longer. As a result, the  No. 1 gun was removed, sonar-related equipment was stored in the ammunition storage and living quarters on the bow, and diesel generators were installed in the conventional auditorium. These refurbishments increased displacement by 230 tonnes. The construction was completed in March 1971 and the vessel was engaged in practical experiments since then. The T-101, which was repeatedly tested on this ship, was later equipped as the Type 75 detector OQS-101 and is mounted on the Shirane type.

Yūgure moved to the 2nd Mine Warfare Force on 2 March 1970 and to the 1st Mine Warfare Force on 10 March 1972, both of which engaged in support missions as flagships. Both ships were removed from the register on 9 March 1974 due to aging, and were returned to the US Navy at Yokosuka. They were dismantled after being sold in 1976.

Ships in the class

References 

Destroyer classes
Fletcher-class destroyers of the Japan Maritime Self-Defense Force